Craigavon City Football Club is a Northern Irish intermediate football club based in Craigavon, County Armagh, playing in Intermediate Division B of the Mid-Ulster Football League. The club was founded in 2007. Club colours are white and navy.

The club participates in the Irish Cup.

External links
 nifootball.co.uk - (For fixtures, results and tables of all Northern Ireland amateur football leagues)

References

 

Association football clubs in Northern Ireland
Association football clubs in County Armagh
Mid-Ulster Football League clubs